Madelaine is a feminine given name. It is a variation of the name Madeleine. It is also a surname.

Individuals with the given name

 Madelaine Edlund, Swedish footballer
 Madelaine Newton, British actress
 Madelaine Petsch, American actress

Individuals with the surname
 Matthieu Madelaine (born 1983), French swimmer
 Louis Philipon de La Madelaine, (1734 – 1818), French writer, chansonnier, philologist and goguettier

See also
 La Madelaine-sous-Montreuil, a commune in the Pas-de-Calais département, France
 Raisin de la Madelaine, a variety of wine grape
 Lamadelaine, a town in the commune of Pétange, Luxembourg
 Lamadelaine railway station
 "Boulevard De La Madelaine", a song by Moody Blues on the album An Introduction to The Moody Blues
 Madeleine (disambiguation)

French feminine given names
English feminine given names